Dichotomius carolinus, the Carolina copris, is a species of dung beetle in the family Scarabaeidae.

References

Further reading

External links

 

Coprini
Articles created by Qbugbot
Beetles described in 1767
Taxa named by Carl Linnaeus